Marelli is a surname. People with this surname or its variants include:

 Aldo Marelli (1919–2010), Italian professional football player
 Luigi Maria Marelli (1858-1936), Italian prelate
 Marco Arturo Marelli (born1949), Swiss set designer and stage director
 Michele Marelli (born 1978), Italian clarinet and basset horn soloist

Surnames